Skjern is a railway town located in western Jutland, Denmark with a population of 7,862 (1 January 2022).

It was the main town of the now abolished Skjern Municipality. Since 2007 it has been, with Ringkøbing, the joint administrative seat of Ringkøbing-Skjern Municipality.

Skjern is served by the Stauning Vestjylland Airport, where Danmarks Flymuseum displaying historic aircraft is also located.

A statue of Holger Danske by Hans Peder Pedersen-Dan was moved to Skjern in 2013 from the Hotel Marienlyst in Helsingør after it was sold on an auction site. The statue is now a turist attraction in Skjern.

Transportation

Rail

Skjern is served by Skjern railway station. It is located on the Esbjerg-Struer and Skanderborg-Skjern railway lines and offers direct regional train services to Esbjerg, Herning, Aarhus and Holstebro.

Air
Skjern is served by the nearby Stauning Vestjylland Airport, where Danmarks Flymuseum displaying historic aircraft is also located.

Popular culture
Skjern is the home town of the player character in the computer roleplaying game Expeditions: Viking.

Notable people 
 Martin Borch (1852 at Skerngaard near Skjern – 1937) a Danish architect
 Egon Hansen (born 1931 in Skjern) a Danish former sports shooter, competed in the 1972 Summer Olympics
 Gnags (formed 1966 in Skjern) a Danish rock band formed by brothers Peter & Jens Nielsen
 Kristian Gjessing (born 1978 in Skjern) a Danish retired handball player, played for Skjern Håndbold and for Denmark
 Marianne Bonde (born 1984 in Skjern) a Danish retired handball player, played for Slagelse DT and for Denmark
 Trine Troelsen (born 1985 in Skjern) a Danish retired handball player, played for FC Midtjylland Håndbold and for Denmark
 Kasper Søndergaard (born in 1981 in Skjern) a Danish retired Handball player, played for Skjern Håndbold and for Denmark
 Mathias Gidsel (born in 1999 in Skjern) a Danish handball player, player for GOG Håndbold, Füchse Berlin and for Denmark

See also
 Skjern River
 Skjern Håndbold, a handball club from Skjern

References

External links
 

Municipal seats of the Central Denmark Region
Municipal seats of Denmark
Cities and towns in the Central Denmark Region
Ringkøbing-Skjern Municipality